The Sun-Reporter is an American weekly newspaper serving the African-American community of San Francisco.  It was founded in 1943.

When Carlton Benjamin Goodlett, the paper's longtime owner, died in 1997, Amelia Ashley-Ward became the paper's proprietor. The Sun-Reporter owns the regions two other black weeklies, the California Voice and the Metro Reporter.

Notable journalists associated with the paper include Thomas C. Fleming.

References

External links

1943 establishments in California
African-American newspapers
Newspapers published in San Francisco
Publications established in 1943
Weekly newspapers published in California